Pierpaolo De Negri (born 5 June 1986) is an Italian professional road bicycle racer, who most recently rode for UCI Continental team . During his career, De Negri has also served a doping suspension, after testing positive for anabolic–androgenic steroids (AAS).

Career
Born in Genoa, De Negri has competed as a professional since the start of the 2010 season, joining the  team full-time after a stagiaire contract with the team in the second half of 2009. In July 2012, De Negri took his first victory for the team, by winning the Trofeo Matteotti race in Italy in a sprint of 25 riders.

De Negri left  at the end of the 2013 season, and joined  for the 2014 season. He remained with the team until the end of 2017, when he joined the new  team.

Doping
On 21 December 2017, De Negri tested positive for anabolic androgenic steroids. In November 2019, De Negri was given a four-year ban – backdated to February 2018, when the positive test was announced.

Major results

2006
 9th GP Città di Felino
2007
 1st Trofeo Martiri del 4 e 11 Luglio 1944
 2nd Gran Premio Somma
 2nd Milano–Rapallo
 2nd Giro del Casentino
 3rd Gran Premio Autodromo di Monza
 3rd Memorial Armenio Armanasco
 3rd Trofeo Pedalata Elettrica – Memorial Gino Bartali
 4th Giro Nazionale del Valdarno
 5th Trofeo G.S. Gavardo Tecmor
 6th Trofeo Alcide Degasperi
2008
 1st Giro del Casentino
 1st Gran Premio Somma
 1st Trofeo Alvaro Bacci
 1st Giro del Valdarno
 1st Coppa A.C. Capannolese
 1st Firenze–Empoli
 2nd Coppa del Mobilio
 2nd Coppa Guinigi
 2nd Trofeo Tempestini Ledo
 3rd ZLM Tour
 3rd Giro del Belvedere
 3rd Trofeo di Autunno
 3rd Trofeo Comune di Lamporecchio
 4th Trofeo Rusconi
 4th Memorial Pigoni & Coli
 4th Firenze–Viareggio
 4th Coppa Giulio Burci
 4th Trofeo delle Colline Capannoresi
 4th Trofeo Caduti di Soprazocco
 5th Gran Premio Sagra della Pizza
2009
 1st GP La Torre
 1st Coppa Giulio Burci
 1st Coppa Caduti
 1st Coppa Cicogna
 2nd GP Montanino
 2nd Giro del Compitese
 3rd Trofeo Edil C
 3rd Firenze–Empoli
 3rd Pistoia–Fiorano
 3rd GP Comune di Cerreto Guidi
 3rd Coppa del Mobilio
 4th Trofeo Franco Balestra
 4th Piccola Sanremo
 4th Memorial Angelo Fumagalli
 4th Coppa Penna
 5th GP Città di Valeggio
 5th Giro delle Due Province
 5th Firenze–Viareggio
 6th Trofeo delle Colline Capannoresi
 6th Coppa Fiera di Mercatale
 6th Parma–La Spezia
 7th Circuito Internazionale di Caneva
 7th Gran Premio Cuoio e Pelli
 8th Trofeo Città di Brescia
 8th Coppa del Mobilio – Time Trial
 10th Trofeo Comune di Lamporecchio
2010
 5th Memorial Marco Pantani
 8th Coppa Bernocchi
2011
 5th Gran Premio Nobili Rubinetterie – Coppa Città di Stresa
 8th Grote Prijs Jef Scherens
2012
 1st Trofeo Matteotti
2013
 Tour of Japan
1st  Points classification
1st Stage 3
 7th Grand Prix Pino Cerami
 7th Giro dell'Appennino
 7th Coppa Sabatini
2014
 1st Stage 1 Circuit des Ardennes
 1st Stage 3 Tour of Japan
 8th Overall Tour of Estonia
2015
 1st Stage 2 Tour of Slovenia
 9th Gran Premio Bruno Beghelli
2016
 1st  Points classification Tour of Japan
 2nd Overall Tour de Hokkaido
1st  Points classification
1st Stage 3
2017
 4th Omloop Mandel-Leie-Schelde
 8th Overall Tour de Hokkaido
 8th Grand Prix of Aargau Canton

Grand Tour general classification results timeline

References

External links

 
 
 Farnese Vini-Selle Italia profile

Italian male cyclists
1986 births
Living people
Sportspeople from Genoa
Cyclists from Liguria